Bigthan ( Bīgṯān, Bīgṯānāʾ) and Teresh ( Ṯereš) were two eunuchs in service of the Persian king Ahasuerus, according to the chapter 2 of the Book of Esther. According to the deuterocanonical/apocryphal additions to the Book of Esther available in the Greek Septuagint translation of the Bible, they were known as Gabatha and Tharra (Koine Greek: Γαβαθά καὶ Θαρρα). Bigthan's name is also spelled "Bigtan" or "Bigthana". It is a Persian name which means "Gift of God".

Narrative
Mordecai rested in the courtyard one day and overheard these two eunuchs plotting to kill the king. He went on to inform the king through Esther, thus thwarting the plot. The two conspirators were apprehended and impaled on poles, and Mordecai's service to the king was recorded in the royal chronicles.

References

External links 
 Greek Esther, beginning with chapter 1
  Le Septante, Esther, chapitre 1 (Greek-French parallel text)

Book of Esther
Hebrew Bible people
Duos
Eunuchs
Ancient slaves